The following is the 1973–74 network television schedule for the three major English language commercial broadcast networks in the United States. The schedule covers primetime hours from September 1973 through August 1974. The schedule is followed by a list per network of returning series, new series, and series cancelled after the 1972–73 season. All times are Eastern and Pacific, with certain exceptions, such as Monday Night Football.

New fall series are highlighted in bold.

Each of the 30 highest-rated shows is listed with its rank and rating as determined by Nielsen Media Research.

 Yellow indicates the programs in the top 10 for the season.
 Cyan indicates the programs in the top 20 for the season.
 Magenta indicates the programs in the top 30 for the season.

PBS, the Public Broadcasting Service, was in operation, but the schedule was set by each local station.

Sunday 

Note: 60 Minutes aired at 6:00-7:00 pm on CBS from January to June 1974.

Monday

Tuesday

Wednesday 
 Thursday 

 Friday 

(*) Formerly The Little People Saturday 

By network

ABCReturning SeriesThe ABC Sunday Night Movie
ABC Movie of the Week
The Brady Bunch
The F.B.I.
Kung Fu
Love, American Style
Marcus Welby, M.D.
Monday Night Football
The Odd Couple
Owen Marshall, Counselor at Law
The Partridge Family
The Rookies
Room 222
The Six Million Dollar Man
The Streets of San Francisco
Temperatures RisingNew SeriesAdam's RibBob & Carol & Ted & AliceChopper One *The Cowboys *Dick Clark Presents the Rock and Roll Years *Doc ElliotFirehouse *GriffHappy Days *Toma *Not returning from 1972–73:Alias Smith and Jones
The Burns and Schreiber Comedy Hour
The Corner Bar
Here We Go Again
The Julie Andrews Hour
Love Thy Neighbor
The Men: Assignment Vienna / The Delphi Bureau / Jigsaw
The Mod Squad
The Paul Lynde Show
The Sixth Sense
The Strauss Family
Thicker than Water
A Touch of Grace

CBSReturning Series60 Minutes
All in the Family
Barnaby Jones
The Bob Newhart Show
Cannon
CBS Thursday Night Movie
The Carol Burnett Show
The New Dick Van Dyke Show
Gunsmoke
Hawaii Five-O
Here's Lucy
M*A*S*H
Mannix
The Mary Tyler Moore Show
Maude
Medical Center
The New CBS Tuesday Night Movies
The Sonny & Cher Comedy Hour
The Waltons
Your Hit ParadeNew SeriesApple's Way *The Bobbie Gentry Show *Calucci's DepartmentDirty Sally *Good Times *HawkinsThe Hudson Brothers Show *KojakThe New Perry MasonRoll OutTony Orlando and Dawn *Not returning from 1972–73:Anna and the King
Bridget Loves Bernie
The Doris Day Show
Mission: Impossible
The New Bill Cosby Show
The Sandy Duncan Show

NBCReturning SeriesAdam-12
Banacek
The Brian Keith Show
Columbo
The Dean Martin Show
Emergency!
The Flip Wilson Show
Hec Ramsey
Ironside
The Magician
McCloud
McMillan & Wife
Monday Night Baseball
NBC Monday Night at the Movies
The NBC Mystery Movie
NBC Saturday Night at the Movies
Sanford and Son
The Wonderful World of DisneyNew SeriesChaseThe Dean Martin Comedy World *DianaFaraday & CompanyThe Girl with Something ExtraLotsa LuckLove StoryThe Mac Davis Show *The MagicianMusic Country USA *NBC FolliesNeedles and PinsPolice StoryThe Snoop Sisters *TenaflyNot returning from 1972–73:'BanyonThe Bobby Darin ShowThe Bold OnesBonanzaDean Martin Presents Music CountryEscapeFirst TuesdayGhost Story/Circle of FearThe Helen Reddy ShowMadiganNBC ReportsNight GalleryRowan & Martin's Laugh-InSearchNote: The * indicates that the program was introduced in midseason.

References

Additional sources
 Castleman, H. & Podrazik, W. (1982). Watching TV: Four Decades of American Television. New York: McGraw-Hill. 314 pp.
 McNeil, Alex. Total Television. Fourth edition. New York: Penguin Books. .
 Brooks, Tim & Marsh, Earle (1985). The Complete Directory to Prime Time Network TV Shows'' (3rd ed.). New York: Ballantine. .

United States primetime network television schedules
1973 in American television
1974 in American television